Semaphorin-5A is a protein that in humans is encoded by the SEMA5A gene.

Members of the semaphorin protein family, such as SEMA5A, are involved in axonal guidance during neural development.

Semaphorin 5A also plays a role in autism, reducing the ability of neurons to form connections with other neurons in certain brain regions.

References

Further reading